Sukhrungphaa also Swargadeo Rudra Singha, (- 27 August 1714) was a Tungkhungia ahom king and 30th king of the Ahom kingdom who reigned from 1696 to 1714. Under whom the kingdom reached its zenith of power and glory, he is considered as the most illustrious of the Ahom kings. At Gadadhar Singha's death, his elder son Lai ascended the throne with the Ahom name of Sukharngpha and the Hindu name of Rudra Singha. He is best known for building a coalition of rulers in the region and raising a vast composite army against the Mughal Empire. He died on the eve of his march west from Guwahati. He had subjugated the Jayantias and the Kachari kingdoms in (1707). He built a new capital at Meteka and named it as Rangpur. Rudra Singha, following the words of his father, decided to reinstate the Vaishnava Gosain and Mahantas, he had settled the Satras in Majuli being nearer to the Ahom metropolis. He had received the initiation of Auniati Gosain, Haridev.

He had invited the Bengali priest Krishnaram Bhattacharya from Bengal to take his initiation. As he did not want to bow down his head before his own mere subject. During Rudra Singha's reign the Ahom nobility far better organized than ever stood behind the king representing the cherished feudal values and aspiration.

His father had to escape persecution by the previous Ahom king and his mother, Joymoti Konwari, was killed in royal custody. He established his capital at new capital Rangpur with bricks. He is also famed to be the real father of Ahom architecture.

Military campaigns

Expedition of Dimasa Kingdom 

The Dimasa Kingdom which has been virtually independent since the day Ahoms got engaged in Ahom–Mughal conflicts. Tamardhwaj Narayan the king of Dimasa Kingdom boldly asserted his independence and claimed territory up to Mahang in a letter sent to Rudra Singha in 1704–05. Such demand by an ‘established and protected’ vassal of the Ahom crown infuriated the Ahom king. Rudra Singha decided to subjugate the Kacharis, also in order to immortalize his military legacy and power, in December 1706 he send two contingent of armies, one under Kamal Lochan Dihingia Deka Borbarua, son of Alun Dihingia Borbarua of Itakhuli fame, through the Dhansiri route, and another under the Pani Phukan, grandson of general  Phul Barua of Saraighat fame, through the Kapili route. The base of the expedition was made at Biswanath. Before the expedition, the Pani Phukan was honoured by the king with a silver encrusted hengdang. The total force composed of 71,000 mens, where there were 3,304 hiloidaris (artillery men) under the Barbarua and 1,847 hiloidaris under the Paniphukan.

March 
The Borbarua with a contingent consisting of archers, baruwatis (shields man) and hiloidaris which numbered 37,000 men. The contingent of Pani Phukan contained 34,000 men, accompanied by a number of commanders along with the Chutia Konwar and the Rajas of Dimarua, Ghagua, Kumoi, Sojai, Panbari, Tiwa, Mikir and Topakuchi, were to march into Kachari country.  The Ahom strategy was to attack from two sides so they could not concentrate their force on any one direction. The whole expedition was supervised by the king in Biswanath.

The  Borbarua's route lay through Raha, Samaguting fort, Namira fort on Nomal Hill, Lathia Hill, Amlakhi, Tarang and Nadereng to Maibang and Mahur. In order to maintain communications and facilitate transmission of supplies, forts were constructed and garrisoned on the route. The Nagas gave trouble on the way but were effectively dealt by the Miri archers. Spies were employed to observe the movements of the enemy. The Kachari offered sporadic, though feeble resistance but could not prevent the Ahom advance. A large booty including a cannon and 700 guns was taken by the Ahoms at Maibong. The Pani Phukan's route lay through Raha, Salgaon, Lambur, Dharmapur, Demera and Nadereng to Maibong. As there was no regular road the army had to cut its way through dense jungle. A garrison of 3,000 men was left at Demera which was occupied; other places were sacked, 322 prisoners were taken. Meanwhile, the Pani Phukan came to know about the occupation of Maibang by the Barbarua and informed the king about the latter. The superior strength of the Ahom army overawed the Kacharis who could not repel the invasion. After the occupation of Maibang the king ordered further advance up to Khaspur to arrest the Kachari king. But at Maibong the troops suffered greatly because of the pestilential climate and many including the Borbarua fell ill. Supplies ran short. Inaction in place of vigour seized the camp.  The Pani Phukan and other commanders were sent orders to march up to Khaspur, but could not march further as there was shortage of supply and many soldiers had died. The remaining soldiers too, were suffering from the pestilential climate of Maibang. But still accordingly, a contingent was sent to Khaspur and encamped at Mai-Lang-Dam. From there three messengers were sent to the Kachari raja to submit to Ahom king.

On the other hand, the king ordered to bring the Borbaura along with the sick soldiers to Demera, the  Borbarua, now seriously ill, died during the return journey to Demera at Kelemu camp. At this point Rudra Singha decided upon to adandon the expedition and ordered the army to return.

Return 
In March 1707 the king recalled the Pani Phukan who brought back the whole force after demolishing the brick fort at Maibang, burning down houses there and erecting a thirteen feet high pillar to commemorate his success. Fortifications were made at Demera where a strong garrison was left, which had to be withdrawn by the king owing to sickness and mortality with the setting in of the rains. Terrified by the advancing Ahom armies, Tamradhvaj fled to Bikrampur and sent an urgent appeal for help to Ram Singh, King of Jaintia Kingdom.

Expedition of Jaintia Kingdom 

Tamradhvaj fled to Bikrampur and sent an urgent appeal for help to Ram Singh, Raja of Jaintia, on the withdrawal of the Ahom forces, he sent a second message to Ram Singh, saying that help was not necessary. Ram Singh now decided to take advantage of the dispersal of the Kachari troops by the Ahoms,  hatched a treacherous plan to seize the person of the Kachari king with a view to gaining possession and control of the Kachari kingdom; under the pretext of a friendly meeting he seized Tamradhvaj along with his wife and carried him off to the Jaintia capital, Jaintipur.

The Kachari queen still in captivity, managed to send a message to Rudra Singh through a 'Bairagi', asking for forgiveness and begging for deliverance from his captor. Rudra Singh sent word to Ram Singh through - the Ahom officer in charge of the Ahom outpost at Jagi, demanding immediate release of Tamradhvaj. Ram Singh refused, Rudra Singh closed the market at Gobha on which the Hill Jaintias depended for their supplies. Rudra Singh made preparations for invasion of Jaintia territory. Rudra Singha established his headquarters at Misa for the expedition. He sent two divisions of the army, one under the Borbarua and other under the Borphukan.

March 
In December, 1707, Surath Singha Borbarua with a force of 43,000 men and number of commanders,  was to march towards Jaintiapur via the Kopili valley and the Kachari country  And the other division under the Borphukan advanced from the Barkharoi camp by the Gobha route,  he was accompanied by the king of Darrang and the Phukan under the Buragohain, a Dafla and a Miri contingent and two Deodhai pandits accompanied him. The Solal Gohain, Duwalia Phukan and the Duwalia Rajkhowas were stationed at Gobha for supply of provisions.

The Borbarua  reached Sampai easily and here a Kachari deputation assured that nothing was to be feared from the neighbouring Naga tribes . He proceeded to Bikrampur and during his march he sent messengers in advance to reassure the people who came and paid their respects and were glad that the forces needed no supplies of provisions from them. The Borbarua desisted his soldiers from ravaging Kachari villages and, assured the latter, and offered presents to help them against the Jaintias.

After the Ahom force reached Mulagul, Ram Singh was called upon to surrender Tamradhvaj and his family and officers.  Envoys were sent to Nawab of Sylhet informing the purpose of mission and reiterating friendship.

Ram Singh prepared for fight, but the nobles who tried to dissuade him from his present adventure would not allow him to escape scotfree. He therefore proceeded towards the Borbarua camp for making his submission, escorted by twenty elephants. Near the camp he was made to dismount and ride on horse-back, unattended. After the interview he was not allowed to return but was made a captive by the Borbarua The Barphukan reached Gobha on 20 January 1708, conciliated the Chiefs of Gobha by presents. His forces on the march were harassed by the Garos at several places. The Garos attacked his men, while they were clearing routes. However, they were dispersed with guns and arrows. His route from Jagi lay through Gobha, Athitbhaga Lachor Hill, Buritikar Hill, the Barpani River banks and Pavanai to Jaintipur. In certain engagements the Jaintias fared well but were ultimately worsted by the Ahoms who had the advantage of superior number and strength and reinforcernents at crucial moments. In another fierce battle the Ahoms killed a number of Jayantia commanders, captured 12 of them along with 20 soldiers and 20 elephants.

After this battle the Jaintia king was compelled to surrender the Kachari king along with all his associates to Borbarua on  11 February 1708. After that both the Borbarua and Borphukan resumed their march towards the Jaintia king, then the Jaintia king along with his son submitted to Borbarua.

Annexation of Jaintia and Dimasa territories 
Rudra Singh ordered the captive kings to be brought to him along with the Jaintia King's garments, jewels, arms, elephants and horses and the Jaintia king's treasures to be divided amongst the troops. The Ahom subjects who had fled to Khaspur during Mir Jumlah's invasion were brought back and an army of occupation under the Borbarua and the Borphukan was stationed at Jaintiapur. Envoys were sent to the Muhammadan Faujdar of Sylhet to announce that the Kachari and Jaintia kingdoms had been annexed to the Ahom dominions. Both the captive kings were presented before the Ahom king, and made to take made to take the oath of allegiance to him.

Expulsion and return 
These measures greatly irritated the Jaintia nobles who induced the Bar Dalai, the Raja of Khairam and the inhabitants of two hundred independent Khasi villages to join them in expelling the invaders. The Jaintias could not rescue their Raja as he was being taken to Gobha by a strong force, but they attacked eight forts with garrisons left by the Bar Phukan and took three of them. A detachment that was taking the copper image of the Goddess Jaintesvari to Rudra Singh was put to flight and the image was rescued. The Ahom soldiers, seized with panic, fled, pursued by the Jaintias. Rudra Singh sent up reinforcements including four thousand men under the Burhagohain. The Jaintia strategy of dispersing when attacked and of returning to the attack themselves thereafter made decisive victory impossible for the Ahoms. The Borbarua and Borphukan sent reinforcements from Jaintiapur, no doubt, but with the approach of the rains, it was thought unwise and dangerous to remain in hostile territory and retreat to Gobha was decided upon. Before departing, the Ahoms put to the sword a thousand inhabitants of Jaintipur and destroyed surrounding villages.

Foils and casualties of campaign 
For the ultimate failure of the expedition, Rudra Singh thought of punishing the Borbarua and the Barphukan but pardoned them on the intercession of other nobles. Rudra Singha severely punished those commanders who expressed unwillingness to march forward against the Jaintias. One ear Dayangia Hazarika and, one eye and ear of one Namatial Hazarika were cut and struck out. One Saikias, both ears, nose were cut off and, eye extracted. One Rajkhowa was also ordered to be beaten up, but upon the intercession of Borphukan, spared but was ordered to patrol with a load of sand by the side of rampart.

In the course of the Jaintia rising, the Ahoms lost 2,366 men including 12 high-ranking officers. About 1,600 persons, chiefly Assamese refugees were brought from Khaspur and 600 from Jaintiapur. During the expedition 3 cannons, 2,273 guns, 109 elephants, 12,000 pieces of silver of the Muhammadan, Ahom, Koch and Jaintia mints and numerous utensils of gold, silver and other metals were taken. Certain articles of jewellery misappropriated by some officers had to be disgorged by them on detection.

Proposed invasion of Bengal

Motives 
Rudra Singha subjugated the Kacharis and Jaintiyas. Who had become virtually independent during the period of the Mughal war in the 17th century.

Rudra Singha had deputed his agents, disguised as itinerant hermits, had visited different parts of India and collected information  about the affairs of the Mughals. Rudra Singha was also informed  of the plight to which Hindus had been rendered. He himself was humiliated by Murshid Quli Khan who sent to him robes as presents which were ment for the vassal chiefs.

Another objective for the expedition to Bengal was,  As said by Surya Kumar Bhuyan was- Assamese pilgrims also received obstruction from the Mughal officers in there visits to the Hindu shrines in India, specifically  in connection with the pilgrimages to the Ganga. The humiliating overtures of Murshid Quli Khan urged Rudra Singha to check the tide of Mughal affronts, received not only by himself but also by his co-religionist.

Rudra Singha was also motivated and inspired by the military achievements of his predecessors and other Assamese rulers. Leaving aside the victorious achievements of Kumar Bhaskarvarman and king Harshadeva of  Kamarupa, the Ahoms had, during the reign of Swarganarayan Suhungmung Dihingia Roja (1497-1539) had conquered Bengal, wholly or partly and, then in the reign of Swargadeo Jayadhwaj Singha (1648-1663).

Preparations 

He then began to make elaborate preparations for a fresh war against Mughals with two ends in view namely, to oust them from their sovereign power in eastern India and to expand their territory to the Ahom kingdom as far as the Karatoya river to the west. Conveying a meeting with nobles and officers, the king expressed his desires thus Rudra Singha said:  The Borpatrogohain supported the king proposal and said:The Borpatrogohain was supported by Burhagohain. But the king, who perhaps expected more inspiring words from the ministers was not satisfied with their tacit approval words from the minister and got angry and dismissed them. At this the Phukans and the Baruas came to support and said,  Rudra Singha was also was not to be discouraged.He carefully thought of his plan to create an opinion among the Hindu Rajah outside Assam. He invited scholars and artist, musicians and artisans and religious men and medicants with due honour and sent monetary presents to those scholars and Brahmans, who couldn't come so far to Assam. He also attempted to organise a confederacy of the Rajas of Hindustan and sent messages to several Rajas and Zamindars, this included  Twipra (and Morang, Bana-Vishnupur, Nadiya, Cooch Behar, Burdwan, and Barahanagar) kingdoms to remove the Mughals from Bengal He appealed to their religious sentiments, which is evident from the letters sent to the king of Tripura Ratna Manikya II, where he wrote: 

Rudra Singha then augmented his army, his artillery and his navy. The local levies were trained on up-to-date lines. He raised a numerous cavalry and trained the elephants to withstand fights. During this preparations he adopted mesausres to obtain good will of the inhabitants of Bengal in order to render his supremacy acceptable to them.

Strength of the army 

Rudra Singha held a council of three days with the three Great Gohains, Baruas, Phukans, and the Rajkhowas, in which an exact register was taken of the various Corps which formed the army. The Upper province including the natives of Assam furnished 3,60,000 men and the vassal chiefs with 40,000 men. Out of which 2,60,000 men were effective . The king however desired more reduction in the army, and only wanted the ablest of soldiers in the expedition, and sent the ineffective men back for cultivation.

The army of Rudra Singha was joined by the armies of Kachari and the Jayantia Rajas along  with the vassal chieftains and the Daflas of the north hills of the Darrang, total mobilised a strong army which total numbered 4,000,00 of whom 16,000 were sent back as being inefficient for the expedition, there were further talks of reduction in army, was assembled  at Guwahati . An advance contingent was sent to the Kandahar Chokey ( Western border) to erect encampments for the armies of the Swargadeo and the princes on the banks of Manas River, and to provide six boats with provisions for every Crops of one thousand men and two hundred thousand rupees for the purchase of salt, oil, and other alimentary articles.

Abandoned 
The whole expedition of Bengal was thought to start in  November 1714  after the autumn harvest which would provide an abundant supply for the army,  and that might be proper  to consult the Pundits, Ganaks and, the Bailungs  to appoint a fortunate day for the march. Just before the expedition could start the Swargadeo Rudra Singha  was seized by a dangerous malady, died on August 27, 1714. His immediate successor gave up on his plan.

Hindu  proclivities 

Rudra Singha reversed the persecution of the Satras as advised Gadadhar Singha in his death-bed, and reinstated the xatra preceptors, including Chaturbhujdeva the satradhikari of Mayamara xatra, in their former seats. He received the initiation from the Auniati Satra, Haridev, who was the most influential Brahmana Satradhikar. However, he soon created a dissension in the Vaisnava camp by promulgating a synod, which debarred the Shudra Mahantas from initiating Brahmins, and which was completely against the principles of creed propagated by Sankardeva.

Inclination towards Shaktism 
Later towards his life he inclined towards Shaktism and thought of becoming an orthodx Hindu, and invited Krishnaram Bhattacharya from Nabadwip, Bengal to take him as his religious guide, and desired to take his initiation, after having promised to given the management of Kamakhya Temple. But sent him back him back after arriving, Krishnaram Bhattacharya went back with fury, and when several earthquakes occurred, noticing this Rudra Singha thought him as a  favourite of God,  re-called Krishnaram back to take his initiation, but died before he could arrive. But, he on his death-bed injunction advised his sons to take his initiation.

Patronage of cultural activities

Since the days of Sudangphaa, Sanskritisation or Indianization of the gained momentum and reached its peak during the regime of Rudra Singha and Siva Singha. Whether in the form of Sakta ritual or in the form of Ekasarana Dharma, the Ahoms kings were receiving increasing doses of Aryanism.

Rudra Singha, being helped by the material conditions of the time, acted more vigorously in the line with his tradition. Now, in the order consolidate the Ahom monarchy in the force of growing feudal forces leading the Neo-Vaishnavite movement, Rudra Singha had to look up for friends among feudal rulers elsewhere in India and to secure a place of confederacy of them, thereby  integrating the Ahom ruling class with the Indian ruling classes, including the Mughals.

He introduce Mughal dress to Ahom court and sent Brahman boys to study at great centres of learning in Bengal and Bihar. He did not fail to patronise local art and culture. He encouraged the culture of local folk music and dance and for this he appointed officers like Gayan Barua. It is said that it was he,who for the first time had the Bihu celebrated in the palace courtyard and organised varied performances for full seven days including competitions of many kinds or sports and games and cultural shows For the promotion of sports and games he created offices like those of Sen-Chowa Barua, who was in charge of training of hawks and Kukura-Chowa Barua, in charge of training of cocks. Rudra Singha had created a new clan called khound consisting of some selected Sanyasis, for the duty of immersion of the ashes of the kings in the Ganges, they were employed as spies.

There were numbers of poets and scholars in his court. Of them the most notable was Kabiraj Chakravarty, who composed the famous drama Sankha-Chuda-Bandha, and had translated the Abhiyana Sukuntalam and the Brahma-Vaivrata Purana into Assamese.
He encouraged exchanges with other kingdoms and sent ambassadors to other royal houses in various parts of India. He created khels or official positions specifically for diplomacy, like Khaund, Kotoki, Bairagi, Doloi, Kakoti. He sent men to Delhi to learn music and Brahman boys to Gurukuls for Vedic and Sanskrit studies. He brought architects from outside for constructing the palace and other buildings in the new capital city, Rangpur. He introduced Mughal style dresses in the Ahom court.

Civil works 
 In 1703, he built the  Rangnath Dol near the Borduar, or main gateway, on the way from the Joysagar Tank to the Talatal Ghar - for the offering of prayers to Shiva.
 Before the Ranganath Dol, a pyramid-shaped temple named Fakuwa Dol was constructed in 1703–04, for the celebration of Holi
 Numerous other architectural monuments and structures are credited to him, including the Namdang stone bridge of Gaurisagar, and the Kharikatia Ali (ali meaning road in Assamese) - leading from Kharikatia to Titabor. The Namdang bridge, a stone bridge 60m long, 6.5m wide, and 1.7m thick was built over the Namdang River in 1703. It is one of the best examples of the engineering workmanship and skill of the Ahom era. This bridge, on National Highway no.37, has been proudly providing service for the last 300 years.

Death

On the 12th day of Aghun the king was seized by a dangerous disease. He had flattered himself daily with hope of speedy recovery, a month passed without smallest improvement of his health. He made charitable donation on all the temples of in the neighbourhood. His pious offering to Kamakhya Temple were twelve buffalos, hundred goats, hundred and fifty pigeons, 200 rupees, twenty tolas of gold and many land grants. For the temple of Hayagriva Madhava Temple he bestowed a large golden vessel, two hundred rupees, thirty tolas of gold.

His pious distributive donations went in vain. Mukali Muriya Bhattacharya was appointed, he  Bhattacharya desired permission to offer his devotions  in the temple of Bhubaneswaree Devi and promised compliance with his order on the ensuing day. Bhattacharya repaired to the temple with rich presents from the King and after performing the usual devotions became absorbed in  the Dyan. In this attitude his person was soon covered with worms which  had crawled from the earth, yet his attention was riveted on the object of  his contemplation. Devi stood before him in the form of a Tiger, yet he altered not his attitude, nor betrayed the slightest emotion of fear. She assumed the figure of a man and threw him forcibly to a considerable distance out of the temple; he rose, returned and recommenced the Dyan. The Goddess now seized and hurled his person into’ the shallow water below; again he ascended the temple and resumed his devotions. Devi at last, appeared before him in the shape of a beautiful woman; expressed her curiosity to be informed of the motives of his absolute perseverance after the trials to which she had subjected him. “If my devotions” answered the Bhattacharya “have proved acceptable to you, acquaint me with the event of the Monarch's indisposition and the period of his death or recovery.” Takooranee informed him that the King would expire on 14th of pooh, in the noon. The Bhattacharya entreated the same information relative to the duration of his own life as a reward for his constant devotion at her alter and received her orders to return to the place of his residence where he might expect the fatal hour at the expiration of a year. The Goddess vanished.

The Bhattacharya repaired to the presence of the King and offering up his prayers, pronounced the news of the Monarch's approaching death at the end of three days. The King asked if the information was true. The Bhattacharya replied that he could no further answer for the reality of the sentence than that he received it from Takooranee. The three Gohains, the Borbarua and Borphukan were immediately called before the Monarch and informed of the approaching period of demise.

Rudra Singha was very much attached to each of his sons and expressed his will from his deathbed that all should become in order of succession. This was in violation is the law of the Primogeniture followed in the Ahom right of Kingship and subsequently led to much trouble which manifested in the form of Konwar Bidroh or (rebellion of princes) in the reign of Lakshmi Singha that enhanced the downfall of the Ahom kingdom, this also included Mohanmala Gohain the third son of Rudra Singha, who was denied kingship.

Death bed injunction

Character and legacy 
The most striking events of his reign, which extended over seventeen eventful years, were the war against the Kachari and Jaintia kings. Although illiterate, Rudra Singha was  possessed with of retentive memory and of exceptional intelligence. He is regarded as the greatest Ahom King. It is also said that he received the submission of all the tribes, and to have established extensive trade with Tibet. Abandoning the policy of isolating the policy of his predecessor to some extent, he encouraged intercourse between the different countries and sent envoys to them of India. He studied foreign customs and adopted those he thought were good. He imported many artificer from Bengal, and also established many schools for Brahmans. Though he is said to be illiterate but he had composed two songs.

Descendants

 Rudra Singha
 Siva Singha
 Kalia Gohain
Tipam Raja
 Pramatta Singha
 Molou Gohain Tipam Raja
 Madhab Gohain Charing Raja
Kana Gohain
Bano Gohain
  Barjana Gohian alias Mohanmala Gohain
Nal Santa
Lerilla Santa
Molia Santa
 Rajeswar Singha
 Ratneswar
 Bijoy Bormura	
 Brajanath	Gohain
 Purandar Singha
 Lakshmi Singha
 Gaurinath Singha
Jayanti Aideo 
Narayani Aideo

See also 
 Ahom Dynasty
 Joy dol

Notes

References 
 Baruah, S L (1993), Last Days of Ahom Monarchy: A History from 1769 to 1826, Munshiram Manoharlal Publishers Pvt Ltd, New Delhi.
 Gait, Sir Edward (1905), A History of Assam, LBS First Edition, 1983, LBS Publications, Guwahati.

 
 
 

Ahom kingdom
Ahom kings
1665 births
1714 deaths
Hindu monarchs